Le May-sur-Èvre (literally Le May on Èvre) is a commune in the Maine-et-Loire department in western France. The population in 2018 was just under 4,000.

Geography
The commune is traversed by the Èvre river. It is around 10 km north of Cholet, and around 50 km east of Nantes.

See also
Communes of the Maine-et-Loire department
The Church Saint-Michael of le May-sur-Èvre

References

Maysurevre